Petter (Pekka) Aakula (September 2, 1866 – June 11, 1928) was a Finnish politician. 

Aakula was born in Mynämäki. A teacher by profession, he was a Social Democrat and was elected to the Parliament of Finland from the Western Kuopio Province constituency. Aakula was a member of the parliament 1909–1911 and 1914–1917. He died in Karttula, aged 61.

References

1866 births
1928 deaths
People from Mynämäki
People from Turku and Pori Province (Grand Duchy of Finland)
Social Democratic Party of Finland politicians
Members of the Parliament of Finland (1909–10)
Members of the Parliament of Finland (1910–11)
Members of the Parliament of Finland (1913–16)
Members of the Parliament of Finland (1916–17)